The 1950–51 Ranji Trophy was the 17th season of the Ranji Trophy. Holkar won the title defeating Gujarat in the final.

Zonal Matches

East Zone

South Zone

North Zone

West Zone

Inter-Zonal Knockout matches

Semi-final

1st Semi-final

2nd Semi-final

Final

Scorecards and averages
Cricketarchive

References

External links
 Ranji Trophy, 1950-51 at ESPNcricinfo archive

1951 in Indian cricket
Indian domestic cricket competitions